Puerto Rico Highway 172 (PR-172) is a secondary highway that connects Caguas, Puerto Rico at PR-1 to downtown Cidra, Puerto Rico and continues its way to its end at Puerto Rico Road 156 in Comerío, Puerto Rico. It is a two-lane per direction road from Caguas to its border point to Cidra and rural all the way to Comerío.

Route description

Dangerous highway
Puerto Rico Highway 172  has about 4 kilometers going uphill. One side of the road is extremely close to the blasted mountain (See Blasting), meaning that landslides would fall in the right lane of the direction close to it; the other side is near a precipice, with barriers that are not safe. The two directions are not divided, and cars can easily collide head-on. Several people have died on this highway, including cars which have been hit by heavy-weight trucks coming down the hill, with brakes that malfunction or in the case of not having enough time to stop. A death occurred on August 16, 2014. There is one emergency ramp which was built to provide safety for the lane going down the mountain.

Rural road in Cidra
Similar to other highways in Puerto Rico which become rural after entering another town from the town of origin, PR-172 becomes rural and enters downtown Cidra before continuing to its end at PR-156 in Comerío. It is mainly flat, and there are no precipices found on the rest of the highway.

Major intersections

See also

 List of highways numbered 172

References

External links
 

172